The men's 4 x 400 metres relay at the 1978 European Athletics Championships was held in Prague, then Czechoslovakia, at Stadion Evžena Rošického on 2 and 3 September 1978.

Medalists

Results

Final
3 September

Heats
2 September

Heat 1

Heat 2

Participation
According to an unofficial count, 48 athletes from 12 countries participated in the event.

 (4)
 (4)
 (4)
 (4)
 (4)
 (4)
 (4)
 (4)
 (4)
 (4)
 (4)
 (4)

References

4 x 400 metres relay
4 x 400 metres relay at the European Athletics Championships